Peters Hill is a hill in Barnstable County, Massachusetts. Green Hill is located southeast and Tom Hill is located south of Peters Hill.

References

Mountains of Massachusetts
Mountains of Barnstable County, Massachusetts